Wheelchair curling at the 2006 Winter Paralympics was played at the Pinerolo Palaghiaccio, in Pinerolo, 30 km southwest of Turin. Wheelchair curling was making its first appearance at the Paralympic Games and took the form of a mixed team event, open to athletes with a physical disability in the lower part of the body that required the everyday use of a wheelchair.

Teams from eight nations, each containing five athletes, entered with four teams advancing from a group stage to a knockout round. Canada won the sport's first Paralympic gold medal beating Great Britain in the final. Sweden won the bronze medal.

Medalists

Preview
Wheelchair curling is played according to the rules of the World Curling Federation, the only modification is that there is no sweeping and stones may be played by hand while leaning over the side of the wheelchair, or pushed by a delivery stick. To be allowed to compete athletes must have a physical disability in the lower part of the body that required the everyday use of a wheelchair. Teams are mixed but must contain at least one member of each sex.
Wheelchair curling was first introduced in Switzerland in 2000 and the first World Championships were held in the same country in 2002. It is governed by the World Curling Federation (WCF); as of 2009, 24 of the WCF's member associations were involved in the sport.

This was the first appearance of the sport at the Paralympic Games; the International Paralympic Committee had granted official medal status to mixed gender wheelchair Curling in March 2002. The organising committee of the Turin Games in 2006 agreed to include wheelchair curling in their programme.

The British team, competing as Scotland and made up of Frank Duffy, Ken Dickson, Tom Killin, Angie Malone and Michael McCreadie had won the gold medal at the World Championships in January 2005 in Glasgow; Denmark and Switzerland won the silver and bronze medals. Britain had also won the 2004 World Championships, and were considered favourites for a medal.

Event summary
Eight teams competed and the format was a round-robin tournament; each nation played all others in a group stage with the top four qualifying for medal playoffs. Canada topped the group, Great Britain finished second and Sweden finished third, all three qualifying for the semi-finals. Denmark and Norway finished joint fourth and faced each other in a tie-breaker match to decide who took the final position in the semi-finals; Norway beat Denmark 4–3 to advance.

The semi-finals saw first seeds Canada play Norway and Great Britain face Sweden. Canada beat Norway 5–4 and Great Britain stole three in the 1st end of their game, going on to win 7–3 win. Sweden only managed to curl 35% as a team, with skip Jalle Jungnell struggling at 23% for the game. Sweden and Norway met in the bronze medal match, the Swedes won 10–3.

In the final Great Britain faced Canada. Trailing 6–3 in the final end British skip Frank Duffy had an opportunity with the last stone of the tournament for an open hit of a Canadian stone that would have scored four for Britain and won them the gold medal. He threw too hard and the shot tracked an inch wide allowing Canada to score one and win 7–4.

Teams
The following athletes represented their nations in the 2006 Paralympic wheelchair curling tournament;

Round-robin standings
Final round-robin standings

Round-robin results
All times are local (UTC+1).

Summary

Session 1
12 March, 11:00

Session 2
12 March, 16:00

Session 3
13 March, 11:00

Session 4
13 March, 16:00

Session 5
14 March, 11:00

Session 6
14 March, 16:00

Session 7
15 March, 11:00

Tie-breaker
15 March, 16:00

Medal round

Semi-finals
17 March, 11:00

Bronze Medal Game
17 March, 16:00

Gold Medal Game
18 March, 11:00

See also
Curling at the 2006 Winter Olympics

References

General

Specific

External links
Torino 2006
Torino 2006 Paralympic Games (English)
ParalympicSport.TV
International Paralympic Committee

2006 Winter Paralympics events
Paralympics
2006
International curling competitions hosted by Italy